Kaçanik or Kačanik is a town and municipality located in the Ferizaj District of southern Kosovo. According to the 2011 census, the town of Kaçanik has 15,634 inhabitants, while the municipality has 33,409 inhabitants.

Name
The founder of the town Koxha Sinan Pasha called the town Kaçaniku. In 1660, Turkish writer and traveler Evliya Çelebi visited Kosovo and  wrote that the town's name derived from the Turkish word kaçanlar in reference to a group of Albanian bandits that operated in Üsküb and used the region of Kaçanik as a hideout. As the Kaçanik area was used as a hideout for the Kachaks, Koca Sinan Pasha built the town fortress to keep out the Kachaks.

History

Early History
The region of Kaçanik was one of the pathways, which were employed during Central European (akin to the Lusatian culture) migrations in the southern Balkans between 1200 and 1150 BCE. Roman era monuments include an altar that dates to 158–9 CE and is dedicated to a deity named Andinus (Deo Andino). The name Andinus appears among the central Illyrian and Dalmatian names, but the worship of Andinus seems to have been a local cult of southwestern Dardani as it doesn't appear in other parts of Illyria or the Roman Empire.

Middle Ages
After 9th century part of kingdom Raška and empire Serbia. Kaçanik was captured by the Ottomans in the 1420s. At that time Kaçanik was only a village registered by the Ottomans in 1455 defter as nahiyah.

Kaçanik was founded by Koca Sinan Pasha, who erected a tower, the town mosque which exists even today, a public kitchen for the poor (imaret), a school near the mosque, two hane (inns similar to caravanserais), one Turkish bath (hammam), the town fortress and a few mills on the Lepenci river.

Kaçanik became known administratively as a town by the end of the 16th century, and up to year 1891 it was a part of the Ottoman Sanjak of Üsküb, which again belonged to the Kosovo Vilayet of the Ottoman Empire.

Modern
In 1878, Kaçanik was intended to become a part of the Principality of Bulgaria according to the Treaty of San Stefano, but per the Treaty of Berlin it was returned to the Ottomans.

During the Albanian Revolt of 1910, the area of Kacanik was the battlefield between Ottoman and Albanian forces.

After 1912 the town became part of the Kingdom of Serbia, and after 1918 part of Kingdom of Serbs, Croats and Slovenes (the first incarnation of Yugoslavia). From 1929 to 1941 Kaçanik was part of the Vardar Banovina of the Kingdom of Yugoslavia.

During World War II, from 1941 to 1945, the town became part of the Kingdom of Bulgaria.

In 1990, after the suspension of Kosovo's autonomy, the members of the Kosovan assembly gathered in the town and adopted the Kaçanik Constitution, based on which the Republic of Kosova was proclaimed in 1991.

During the Kosovo War, Yugoslav forces including the army, police and paramilitary groups carried out operations in the town that led to high numbers of civilian casualties and mass flights of civilians from Kaçanik.

Demographics

According to the last official census done in 2011, the municipality of Kaçanik has 33,409 inhabitants. Based on the population estimates from the Kosovo Agency of Statistics in 2020, the municipality has 34,420 inhabitants.

With the exception of eight Roma and 30 Bosniaks, the municipality is ethnically homogeneous Albanian.

Economy
The municipality is known for the production of construction materials at several area companies. There are also many cultivated farmlands and areas suited for the development of farms, apiculture, arboriculture as well as various craftsman and artisans. The area is well suited for the development of winter and summer tourism. The downtown area is home to a bus station, a small radio station, the remains of a Turkish fort, several streets lined with shops, banks, several restaurants, and a weekly farmers market for produce, livestock and housewares.

Kaçanik has an old tradition in private manufactures, especially when it comes to the production of calcareous stone, wood for construction purposes and other services and artisan skills.

Culture

Sport

Sports teams
KF Lepenci is the men's football club in the town and they play their home matches at Besnik Begunca Stadium. KFF Bazeli 2015 is the women's football club in the town and they play in the top level of the women's football league in Kosovo.

Notable people

Ag Apolloni, writer 
Adem Salihaj, politician
Arben Zharku, film producer
Jeton Neziraj, playwright
Jetmir Topalli, footballer
Triumf Riza, police officer
Veton Tusha, footballer
Ylber Hysa, historian

Gallery

See also
Musa Kesedžija
Musa Çelebi
Kaçanik Gorge 
Sharr Mountains National Park 
R 6 Motorway 
Sinan Pasha Mosque (Kaçanik)

Notes

References

External links

Municipality of Kaçanik
Kaçanik (In Albanian)
SOK Kosovo and its population

 
Municipalities of Kosovo
Cities in Kosovo